AFC Ajax Vrouwen is a Dutch football club from Amsterdam representing AFC Ajax in the Vrouwen Eredivisie, the top women's league in the Netherlands. The team was founded in 2012.

Current squad

Former players

Results

BeNe League / Eredivisie

a=at moment of abandonment due to Covid

a=at moment of abandonment due to Covid

UEFA Women's Champions League
All results (away, home and aggregate) list Ajax's goal tally first.

Affiliated clubs
On 13 January 2013, it was revealed that AFC Ajax Vrouwen would partner with SV Overbos, the Women's team from Hoofddorp.

  SV Overbos (2013–present)

Coaching staff

Head coaches
  Ed Engelkes (2012–2016)
  Benno Nihom (2016-2019)
  Danny Schenkel (2019–2022)
  Suzanne Bakker (2022-)

Broadcasting
As of the 2020–21 season, league matches played on Sunday are broadcast on ESPN. Public service broadcaster NOS occasionally broadcasts some Sunday games live and provides game highlights during the Studio Sport programme.

Honours

Women's Eredivisie (2) : 2016-17, 2017–18
KNVB Women's Cup (5): 2013-14, 2016–17, 2017–18 , 2018-19, 2021-22
Eredivisie Cup (1) : 2020-21

References

External links
Official site

 
 
BeNe League teams
2012 establishments in the Netherlands
Association football clubs established in 2012
Eredivisie (women) teams
Football clubs in Amsterdam